Auriculella uniplicata was a species of tropical air-breathing land snails, terrestrial pulmonate gastropod mollusks. This species was endemic to Hawaii, United States.

References

Auriculella
Extinct gastropods
Taxonomy articles created by Polbot